Worthville is an unincorporated community in Butts County, in the U.S. state of Georgia.

History
An early variant name was "Lofton's Store". A post office called Worthville was established in 1850, and remained in operation until 1901.

References

Unincorporated communities in Georgia (U.S. state)
Unincorporated communities in Butts County, Georgia